Sand Hill, Mississippi may refer to the following places in Mississippi:
Sand Hill, Attala County, Mississippi, a ghost town
Sand Hill, Copiah County, Mississippi, an unincorporated community
Sand Hill, Greene County, Mississippi, an unincorporated community
Sand Hill, Jones County, Mississippi, an unincorporated community
Sand Hill, Rankin County, Mississippi, an unincorporated community